Manuel Rodríguez Island (Spanish: Isla Manuel Rodríguez) is an island in the Queen Adelaide Archipelago in Magallanes y la Antártica Chilena Region, Chile.

It is bounded on the east by the Smyth Channel and on the south by the Strait of Magellan.

Islands of Magallanes Region

es:Isla Manuel Rodriguez